Burgaw is a town in, and the county seat of, Pender County, North Carolina, United States. The population was 3,088 at the 2020 census.

Burgaw is part of the Wilmington Metropolitan Statistical Area.

History
The town most likely derives its name from nearby Burgaw Creek.

The Bannerman House, Burgaw Depot, Burgaw Historic District, and Pender County Courthouse are listed on the National Register of Historic Places.

Geography
Burgaw is located at  (34.550506, -77.926075).

Demographics

2020 census

As of the 2020 United States census, there were 3,088 people, 1,249 households, and 682 families residing in the town.

2000 census
As of the census of 2000, there were 3,337 people, 954 households, and 649 families residing in the town. The population density was 971.6 people per square mile (375.6/km2). There were 1,051 housing units at an average density of 306.0 per square mile (118.3/km2). The racial makeup of the town was 51.21% White, 44.89% African American, 0.69% Native American, 0.12% Asian, 2.10% from other races, and 0.99% from two or more races. Hispanic or Latino of any race were 4.50% of the population.

There were 954 households, out of which 33.9% had children under the age of 18 living with them, 42.7% were married couples living together, 22.2% had a female householder with no husband present, and 31.9% were non-families. 28.6% of all households were made up of individuals, and 13.2% had someone living alone who was 65 years of age or older. The average household size was 2.39 and the average family size was 2.92.

In the town, the population was spread out, with 18.8% under the age of 18, 9.2% from 18 to 24, 34.0% from 25 to 44, 19.9% from 45 to 64, and 18.1% who were 65 years of age or older. The median age was 37 years. For every 100 females, there were 128.7 males. For every 100 females age 18 and over, there were 137.4 males.

The median income for a household in the town was $28,819, and the median income for a family was $36,813. Males had a median income of $29,750 versus $21,792 for females. The per capita income for the town was $13,831. About 13.0% of families and 19.3% of the population were below the poverty line, including 24.1% of those under age 18 and 20.2% of those age 65 or over.

References

External links
 Official Burgaw, NC website

Towns in North Carolina
Towns in Pender County, North Carolina
County seats in North Carolina
Cape Fear (region)
Populated places established in 1850
1850 establishments in North Carolina